is a Japanese former footballer who is last known to have been a member of Singapore's Hougang United in 2015.

Singapore
Scoring in a pre-season friendly encountering Johor Darul Ta'zim, Manato was recruited by Hougang United for the 2015 S.League,
forming what was regarded by coach Salim Moin as a redoubtable strike partnership with Equatoguinean Chupe in pre-season. However, after missing two games on account of injury, the Japanese attacker was by the Cheetahs with Renshi Yamaguchi.

References

External links 
 Soccerway Profile

Japanese expatriate footballers
Association football forwards
Expatriate footballers in Singapore
Japanese footballers
Living people
Singapore Premier League players
Hougang United FC players
Year of birth missing (living people)